Banc of America Securities LLC (BAS), was the investment banking subsidiary of Bank of America until it was merged with Merrill Lynch after that firm's acquisition in 2008 to become Bank of America Merrill Lynch.  Headquartered in New York City, the company competed in both the domestic and international equity and investment banking markets.

The company was a registered broker-dealer with the United States Securities and Exchange Commission (SEC) and was a member of the New York Stock Exchange and the National Association of Securities Dealers. The use of "Banc" in the BAS's name was indicative of the fact that the company was not a bank, and its deposits and other holdings were not insured by the Federal Deposit Insurance Corporation.

History 
The subsidiary was founded in 1998 following a strategy pioneered by Citigroup that combines corporate lending with investment banking advice and services.

During its years of operation its strongest investment banking groups included high-yield debt underwriting and Leveraged Finance, in addition to industry coverage groups such as Healthcare, Consumer & Retail, Global Industries, Media & Telecom, Financial Institutions, Real Estate and Gaming. BAS also did a significant amount of work for Financial Sponsors, or private equity firms, often financing leveraged transactions. On the product side, the firm employed M&A senior bankers throughout the industry coverage groups.  BAS also had a stand-alone Mergers & Acquisitions Group, consisting of bankers that transact M&A deals across all industries, as well as a Transaction Development Group, which aimed to identify and market transaction opportunities. The unit also had sizeable fixed income, currency and commodities divisions.

During 2007-2008, BAS significantly downsized its international operations, eliminating a number of industry groups in Europe, as well as cutting numerous banking and sales and trading positions in North America and Asia prior to its merger with Merrill Lynch.
On October 3, 2008, Bank of America announced that John Thain would lead the combined Bank of America/Merrill Lynch Global Corporate and Investment Banking enterprise. Thain was forced out by Bank of America Chairman Kenneth D. Lewis on January 22, 2009, because of the colossal losses visited on B of A due to its acquisition of Merrill Lynch. With Thain's departure, Brian Moynihan became president of Global Banking and Global Wealth and Investment Management. After the merger was closed, the SEC Registration of Banc of America Securities was terminated in January 2011.

Offices 
BAS operated from a number of offices across the world, with major offices in New York, New York, Charlotte, North Carolina, Chicago, Illinois, San Francisco, California, Tokyo, Frankfurt, London, and Mumbai. The bulk of its investment banking operations eventually moved to the Bank of America Tower, a $1 billion, 58-story skyscraper, at Bryant Park in New York City that was completed in 2009. Prior to that, BAS in New York had offices in various locations due to the numerous mergers that had taken place over the previous decade, including space at 9 West 57th Street, 1633 Broadway, 40 East 52nd Street, and 335 Madison Avenue.

See also 

Primary dealers
Investment banking

References

External links
Financial Statements
Banc of America Securities Global Equities and Electronic Trading Services site
Bank of America Corporation's website

Bank of America
Banks established in 1998
Financial services companies established in 1998
Banks disestablished in 2008
Financial services companies disestablished in 2008
Former investment banks of the United States
Banks based in New York City